The Unholy Three can refer to the following:

 The Unholy Three, a 1917 novel by Tod Robbins
 The Unholy Three (1925 film), directed by Tod Browning
 The Unholy Three (1930 film), a remake of the 1925 film directed by Jack Conway
 The Unholy Three (magic trio), a magic cabaret act
 The Unholy Three (comics), a two-part DC comic book special, part of JSA: The Liberty Files